Ludwig Edward Fraenkel FRS (28 May 1927 – 27 April 2019) was a German-born British mathematician, and professor at the University of Bath. He was the son of classicist Eduard Fraenkel.

Education
He earned an undergraduate degree (in 1947) and a Master of Science degree (in 1948) from the University of Toronto in the area of Aeronautical Engineering. His thesis was on the design of nozzles for supersonic wind tunnels.

Awards and honours
In 1989, he was awarded the Senior Whitehead Prize. He was elected a Fellow of the Royal Society in  1993.

References

2019 deaths
1927 births
20th-century British mathematicians
21st-century British mathematicians
Alumni of Queens' College, Cambridge
Academics of the University of Bath
Fellows of the Royal Society
German emigrants to England
Fellows of Queens' College, Cambridge